The Well is twenty seventh studio album by American blues singer and harmonica player Charlie Musselwhite. It was released in August 2010. It was his first release on Alligator Records label since 1993 album In My Time. In the title song he credits Jessica McClure's ordeal as a child trapped in a well for over 58 hours in 1987 for inspiring him to quit drinking, stating, She was trapped in there with a broken arm in the dark, in a life-and-death situation she was singing nursery rhymes to herself and being brave...It made my problems seem tiny. So as a prayer to her and myself, I decided I wasn't going to drink till she got out of that well. It was like I was tricking myself, telling myself that I wasn't going to quit for good, just until she got out. It took three days to get her out, and I haven't had a drink since.

Track listing
"Rambler's Blues" – 3:45
"Dig the Pain" – 2:23
"The Well" – 3:18
"Where Hwy 61 Runs" – 4:24
"Sad and Beautiful World" – 3:39
"Sonny Payne Special" – 2:22
"Good Times" – 3:28
"Just You, Just Blues" – 3:59
"Cadillac Women" – 4:08
"Hoodoo Queen" – 4:09
"Clarksdale Getaway" – 4:13
"Cook County Blues" – 3:38
"Sorcerer's Dream" – 4:10

Personnel
Charlie Musselwhite – vocals, harmonica
John Bazz – bass
Dave Gonzales – guitar, vocals
Stephen Hodges – drums, percussion
Mavis Staples – vocals

References

2010 albums
Charlie Musselwhite albums
Alligator Records albums